The Anderssons Hit the Road is a Swedish comedy, children and family film opening at cinemas in Sweden on 25 December 2013. It was written by Hannes Holm together with Anders Jacobsson and Sören Olsson, and among the actors were William Ringström, Morgan Alling and Anja Lundqvist.

Plot
The Andersson's family go on a road trip across Europe towards a village in South Tyrol, where Mr. and Mrs. Andersson went on a honeymoon 20 years earlier. Living in the village is a girl Sune likes, but also an artist who can make the family rich.

Production

The church wedding scenes at the beginning were shot at Nödinge Church in early July 2013.

The vacationing scenes were shot at places like Hanover, Bolzano, the Brenner Pass and the Tyrol village of Margreid an der Weinstraße. The amusement park scenes were shot at Ravenna, but represent central Germany.

Cast

Home video
The film was released to DVD and Blu-ray in 2014'.

References

External links

2010s children's comedy films
Films based on works by Anders Jacobsson and Sören Olsson
Films directed by Hannes Holm
Films set in Italy
Swedish comedy films
2010s Swedish-language films
2010s road movies
Films about vacationing
Swedish sequel films
2013 films
Films shot in Sweden
2013 comedy films
Films shot in Italy
Films shot in Germany
2010s Swedish films